George McGeachie (26 October 1918 – 12 November 1972) was a Scottish footballer who played as a defender. Most notably for Crystal Palace and Rochdale.

References

1918 births
1972 deaths
Scottish footballers
Association football defenders
St Johnstone F.C. players
Leyton Orient F.C. players
Rochdale A.F.C. players
Crystal Palace F.C. players
Wigan Athletic F.C. players
English Football League players
Footballers from North Lanarkshire